Mitan is an urban-type settlement in Samarkand Region, Uzbekistan. It is part of Ishtixon District. The town's population in 1989 was 4678 people.

References

Populated places in Samarqand Region
Urban-type settlements in Uzbekistan